Peter Young is a former British cross-country skier and seven time Paralympian. He won two medals in cross-country skiing for Britain in 1984 and 1994. He is the only British person in the Olympics or Paralympics to have won a medal in cross-country skiing.

References 

British male cross-country skiers
Year of birth missing (living people)
Living people
Medalists at the 1984 Winter Paralympics
Medalists at the 1994 Winter Paralympics
Paralympic medalists in cross-country skiing
Paralympic bronze medalists for Great Britain
Cross-country skiers at the 1984 Winter Paralympics
Cross-country skiers at the 1994 Winter Paralympics
Paralympic cross-country skiers of Great Britain